Events from the year 1839 in Spain.

Incumbents
Monarch: Isabella II
Regent: Maria Christina of the Two Sicilies
Prime Minister: Isidro de Alaix Fábregas (until 3 February), Evaristo Pérez de Castro y Brito (starting 3 February)

Events
May 12 - Battle of Ramales
November 10 - The first known photograph taken in Spain is taken at the Pla de Palau, Barcelona

Births
 February 18 – Pascual Cervera y Topete, Spanish admiral (d. 1909)
 September 7 – Patricio Montojo y Pasarón, Spanish admiral (d. 1917)

Deaths
Carlos de España

See also
First Carlist War

 
1830s in Spain
Years of the 19th century in Spain